HNoMS Trondheim (pennant number F302) was an  of the Royal Norwegian Navy.

Service history
On 17 March 2006 at 20:10 CET, Trondheim ran aground off Lines island in Sør-Trøndelag. No injuries among the 121-man crew were reported. The incident was reported from the ship itself, and at 20:30 it came loose again. Water flooded two compartments (paint storage and forward pump room) of the ship. The compartments were sealed and three ships were sent to assist the frigate. The frigate was towed to port in Bergen by the coast guard vessel .

HNoMS Trondheim was used after decommissioning as a target ship for the testing of Norway's 'Naval Strike Missile', and sank on June 6, 2013.

References

1964 ships
Ships built in Horten
Oslo-class frigates
Cold War frigates of Norway